Golden "Big" Wheeler (December 15, 1929 – July 20, 1998) was an American Chicago blues and electric blues singer, harmonicist and songwriter. He released two albums in his lifetime and is best known for his recordings of the songs "Damn Good Mojo" and "Bone Orchard". He worked with the Ice Cream Men and Jimmy Johnson. He was the brother of the blues musician James Wheeler.

Biography
He was born Golden Wheeler in Baconton, Georgia. He left Georgia in 1941 and settled in Chicago, Illinois, in July 1954, where he befriended Little Walter. His enthusiasm for playing the harmonica began when he was working as a taxicab driver. One of his regular customers was the harmonica player Buster Brown, who later had a hit record with "Fannie Mae", in 1960. Wheeler fronted his own band by 1956, although he was a part-time musician, working for years as an auto mechanic to supplement his income and provide for his family.

In 1993, Wheeler released his first album, Bone Orchard, on which he was backed by a local band, the Ice Cream Men. Released by Delmark Records (Delmark 661), it recreated a 1950s feel, with backing two guitars and drums, but no bass guitar. The Ice Cream Men were Johnny Burgin and Dave Waldman (guitars) and Steve Cushing (drums). The album was produced by Bob Koester.

His next album was Jump In (1997), with backing that provided a fuller sound, including his brother, James Wheeler, on guitar. Other musicians who played on the album were Baldhead Pete (drums), Allen Batts (piano) and Bob Stroger (bass), with Koester again producing.

Wheeler died of heart failure in Chicago in July 1998, at the age of 68.

Discography

Albums
Bone Orchard (1993), Delmark
Jump In (1997), Delmark

See also
List of Chicago blues musicians
List of harmonicists

References

1929 births
1998 deaths
American blues singers
Songwriters from Georgia (U.S. state)
American blues harmonica players
Chicago blues musicians
Harmonica blues musicians
Singers from Georgia (U.S. state)
20th-century American singers
Songwriters from Illinois
20th-century American male singers
American male songwriters